Longview is a census-designated place and unincorporated community located along Mississippi Highway 12 in Oktibbeha County, Mississippi.

It was first named as a CDP in the 2020 Census which listed a population of 295.

Demographics

2020 census

Note: the US Census treats Hispanic/Latino as an ethnic category. This table excludes Latinos from the racial categories and assigns them to a separate category. Hispanics/Latinos can be of any race.

Education
It is in the Starkville-Oktibbeha Consolidated School District, which operates Starkville High School.

It was in the Starkville School District prior to the merger with Oktibehha County's district.

References

Unincorporated communities in Oktibbeha County, Mississippi
Unincorporated communities in Mississippi
Census-designated places in Oktibbeha County, Mississippi